The Al-Burtasi is a mosque in Tripoli, Lebanon.  The Burtasi mosque is considered one of the most beautiful Mamluk mosques in Tripoli. It is distinguished by its minaret and by its dark stone front decorated by black lines and white ornamentation.

History 
The inscription on the main gate does not provide the date of its construction, but it is inferred that the mosque was constructed before 1381.

Architecture 
The minaret and three domes are distinguishing features of this mosque.

Interior 
The qibla wall is lined with marble, with the mihrab in the center. The mihrab is decorated with glass mosaic, which is rare for mosques in Tripoli.
In front of a golden background a goblet is shown that holds green acanthus.

Sources

References

Mamluk architecture in Lebanon
Mosques in Tripoli, Lebanon